Narasapuram Municipality is the local self government in Narasapuram, a town in the Indian state of Andhra Pradesh. It is classified as a first grade municipality.

Administration

Civic works and services
The city municipality implements the use of local language, Telugu in civic services and also publishes Narsapur Times.

See also
 List of municipalities in Andhra Pradesh

References

1956 establishments in Andhra Pradesh
Government agencies established in 1956
Municipal Councils in Andhra Pradesh